"I Guess I'm Crazy" is a 1955 song composed by Werly Fairburn. The song was first recorded in 1955 by Tommy Collins who peaked at number thirteen on the C&W Best Seller chart.

Jim Reeves version
 In 1964, Jim Reeves had his first of six posthumous number one hits on the U.S. country music chart with his version of "I Guess I'm Crazy", which spent seven weeks at the top and a total of twenty-four weeks on the chart.  On the Easy Listening charts it peaked at number eighteen.  "I Guess I'm Crazy" also topped the Canadian charts for a single week, making this song to be the first song ever to top the newly formed RPM Country charts in Canada.

Chart performance

Tommy Collins

Jim Reeves

Other Cover Versions
 It was later covered in April 1965 By Irish Country singer Larry Cunningham, and peaked #4 at the Irish charts.

References

1955 singles
Tommy Collins (singer) songs
1964 singles
Jim Reeves songs
Song recordings produced by Chet Atkins
1955 songs
RCA Records singles